Water is an extended play by Sister Hazel, released on February 9, 2018. The EP is the first part of a series of four EPs titled "Elements" planned to be released over 2 years.  The second part of the series, Wind, was released on September 7, 2018.

Commercial performance
The EP debuted on Billboards Top Country Albums at No. 9, No. 2 on Independent Albums, No. 14 on Top Rock Albums, and No. 96 on the Billboard 200, selling 7,000 copies in the United States in the first week.

Track listing

Charts

References

2018 debut EPs
Sister Hazel albums
Self-released EPs